Mareng is a village development committee in the Arghakhanchi District of the Lumbini Zone of southern Nepal. At the time of the 1991 Nepal census it had a population of 4,102 and had 782 houses in the town.

References

Populated places in Arghakhanchi District